"Star Sign" is a song recorded by Scottish rock band Teenage Fanclub. The song was released on 12 August 1991 through Creation Records, as the lead single from the band's third studio album Bandwagonesque. The song was written and sung by vocalist and bassist Gerard Love.

The song peaked at number four on Billboard Modern Rock Tracks chart, making it the band's best-charting song in the United States. It also hit number 44 on the UK Singles Chart.

Charts

References

1991 singles
1991 songs
Creation Records singles
Shoegaze songs